Robert Lyon (July 6, 1829 - March 21, 1888) was a lawyer, politician and judge in the County of Carleton in eastern Ontario. He was mayor of Ottawa in 1867 and a Liberal member of the Legislative Assembly of Ontario from 1867 to 1871.

His father, George Lyon, was a Scottish captain in the British army, who settled in Richmond, Ontario. His oldest brother was George Byron Lyon, another mayor of Ottawa. Robert was born in the village of Richmond in 1829.

He studied law and was called to the bar in 1853. He began practicing law in Ottawa in 1856. He became an alderman and later mayor. Lyon also represented Carleton in the Ontario legislature from 1867 to 1871. He was named a judge for Carleton County in 1873.

Lyon street in downtown Ottawa is named after the family, as is the underground Lyon Station on the Confederation line of Ottawa's light rail system.

References

 Historical Sketch of the County of Carleton (1971) - originally published in 1879, reprinted by Mika Press, Belleville, Ontario

External links 

1888 deaths
Canadian people of Scottish descent
Judges in Ontario
Mayors of Ottawa
Ontario Liberal Party MPPs
1829 births